Dangerous Woman is a 2016 album by Ariana Grande.

Dangerous Woman or Dangerous Women may also refer to:

Art and literature
A Dangerous Woman, 1910 novel by Australian-born English writer Effie Adelaide Rowlands
"A Dangerous Woman", 1957 American short story by James T. Farrell
A Dangerous Woman, 1991 American novel by Mary McGarry Morris
Dangerous Women (anthology), 2013 American science fiction/fantasy collection
A Dangerous Woman: Subversion & Surrealism in the Art of Honoré Sharrer, 2017–18 American art exhibition

Film and TV
A Dangerous Woman (1929 film), an American drama
A Dangerous Woman (1976 film), a 1976 South Korean film with Baek Il-seob
, an Italian drama
A Dangerous Woman (1993 film), an American romantic drama
Dangerous Women (American TV series), an American and British syndicated soap opera
The Dangerous Woman, character portrayed by Virginia Madsen in the 2006 film A Prairie Home Companion
Dangerous Woman (South Korean TV series), 2011 South Korean soap opera also known as Dangerous Women
A Dangerous Woman, 2014 South Korean short film; winner of the Mise-en-scène Short Film Festival's Ollehtv Audience Award

Music
"Dangerous Woman", 1959 single by American blues singer Junior Parker
"Dangerous Woman", song from 1967 American film Trunk to Cairo
"Dangerous Woman", song by American rock band House of Lords from the 2008 album Anthology
"Dangerous Woman" (song), 2016 single by Ariana Grande from same-named album
Dangerous Woman Tour, Grande's 2017 international tour in support of her 3rd studio album of the same name